Helena High School is a public high school for grades 9 through 12 located in Helena, Montana, United States. It is part of the Helena Public School District. Founded in September 1876, it is the oldest high school in the state of Montana. A new building was completed in August 1935 and it was almost destroyed a few months later in the 1935 Helena earthquake. In 1955, the building became Helena Junior High School (now Helena Middle School) and Helena High School moved into its present location at 1300 Billings Avenue, just off Montana Avenue.

Curriculum
Four foreign languages are taught at Helena High: French, German, Latin, and Spanish. The English Department, with 22 faculty, offers instruction in English literature and composition, as well as elective studies. Students are encouraged to take honors and Advanced Placement (AP) in English, math, science, and history. There are also many elective options.

Extracurricular activities
There are many extra-curricular clubs and activities for students to get involved at Helena High School. School teams and clubs include:

 Basketball – Boys and Girls
 Cross Country – Boys and Girls
 Fast Pitch Softball
 Football
 Soccer – – Boys and Girls
 Swimming
 Tennis – Boys and Girls
 Track and Field – Boys and Girls
 Volleyball
 Wrestling
 Speech and Debate
 Mock Trial

Notable alumni
Max Baucus, former United States Senator and United States Ambassador to China (graduated in 1959)
Steve Bullock, former governor of Montana
Dan Carpenter, NFL placekicker for the Buffalo Bills
Gary Cooper, Academy Award winning actor (dropped out in his sophomore year)
Chuck Darling, member of 1956 Summer Olympics basketball gold medalists, First team All-American at University of Iowa
Pat Donovan, NFL tackle for the Dallas Cowboys
David Fuller, politician. Montana state senator
L. Ron Hubbard, author and the founder of Scientology; enrolled at Helena High during his junior year
Carol Judge (1958), First Lady of Montana (1973–1980); healthcare activist and registered nurse
Ian MacDonald (born Ulva Pippy), actor on film and television
Colin Meloy, lead singer and songwriter for the Portland, Oregon, folk-rock band The Decemberists
Maile Meloy, author
Kimberly Reed, director and producer of Prodigal Sons
William Roth, former member of the United States Senate from Delaware
A. L. Strand, president of Montana State College (1937–1942) and Oregon State University (1942–1961)
Joseph P. Mazurek, former Montana Attorney General and member of the Montana Senate

Footnotes

Bibliography 
 Superintendent of Public Instruction. Biennial Report of the Superintendent of Public Instruction. Vol. II. Montana Department of Public Instruction. Helena, Mont.: Independent Publishing Co., 1903.

External links 
 Official Helena High School Web site

Public high schools in Montana
Buildings and structures in Helena, Montana
Schools in Lewis and Clark County, Montana
1876 establishments in Montana Territory